Stefano Magno (around 1499 – 14 October 1572) was a Venetian chronicler.

Biography 
According to Kenneth Setton, Stefano Magno was born around 1499 (his father's name was Andrea) and died on 14 October 1572. According to Marios Philippides he was born in 1490 and died in 1557. He was a member of the noble Venetian Magno family.

Works

Cronaca Magno 
The authorship of the manuscript often named as Cronaca Magno is attributed to Stefano Magno. This work is based on the work of Aeneas Sylvius (Pope Pius II). Stefano Magno frequently quotes dispacci of Bartolomeo Minio in his chronicle.

Annali Veneti e del Mondo 
His work Annali Veneti e del Mondo is a five-volume manuscript archived in the library of the Museo Correr. This manuscript is described as "one of the more important literary sources for the last two decades of fifteenth century", providing "extraordinary coverage" of events almost all over Europe and Levant. It also covers the process of Islamization of Albanians and presents information about the Muslim conquest of Skanderbeg's stronghold, Krujë.

The 19th-century Greek historian and researcher Constantine Sathas published extracts of the Venetian chronicle of Stefano Magno connected with the history of Greece (Μνημεία Ελληνικής Ιστορίας [Monuments of Greek History]), which Kenneth Setton considers carelessly transcribed.

The first volume of his Annali Veneti e del Mondo describes the origins of the Venetian noble families and presents the alphabetically arranged list with dates of their admission to the Great Council of Venice, with their coats of arms presented in color. The fourth volume describes the period from 1478 to 1481, and contains a description of the Siege of Krujë in 1478.

References 
Notes

Bibliography

Further reading 
 

1490 births
1557 deaths
16th-century Italian historians
16th-century Venetian people